The 1993 Northern Illinois Huskies football team represented Northern Illinois University as a member of the Big West Conference during the 1993 NCAA Division I-A football season. Led by third-year head coach Charlie Sadler, the Huskies compiled an overall record of 4–7 with a mark of 3–3 in conference play, placing fifth in the Big West. Northern Illinois played home games at Huskie Stadium in DeKalb, Illinois.

Schedule

Roster

References

Northern Illinois
Northern Illinois Huskies football seasons
Northern Illinois Huskies football